HP SPaM (Hewlett-Packard Strategic Planning and Modeling) is an internal consulting group that supports HP businesses on mission-critical strategic and operation decisions. As evidenced by its publications and awards, SPaM has been a prominent example of the deployment and practice of OR/MS (operations research and the management science) in large companies.  Together with HP Labs, SPaM represents HP at the INFORMS Roundtable, a group of organizations whose purpose is to promote OR/MS excellence in practice.

History

Contributions

SPaM pioneered and leads innovation in supply chain and procurement practices.  They created dramatic improvements in manufacturing, distribution, procurement, product design, forecasting, metrics, and inventory control
efficiencies; leading to the publication and adoption of their methods outside HP.  Notable contributions include:

 Popularizing and helping to drive the adoption of postponement in high-tech products, as a gain in efficiency in building responsive supply chains that support a high variety of product versions (SKUs or stock keeping units) and configurations

 Developing and popularizing the concept of using a single metric to measure the full end-to-end costs associated with carrying inventory, to support better supply chain decisions.

 The use of simple, practical spreadsheet tools to deploy the power of advanced statistical inventory target setting to a broad range of businesses.

 Popularizing the concept of product design for supply chain; leading product development teams to minimize end-to-end costs for design, production, distribution, and support instead of focusing solely on minimizing material costs and development schedules as was previously common practice.

Founders

The team was established in 1989 by Corey Billington (currently a professor at IMD) who had recently joined HP and was working with Sara Beckman (currently a Senior lecturer at UC Berkeley).  Billington asked then HP CEO Lew Platt for $100K to start a team focusing on efficiency and inventory within HP.  Soon after, Corey added Tom Davis, Paul Gibson, Steve Rockhold, Rob Hall, Marguerita Sasser, and Ed Feitzinger to the team and began a collaboration with Hau Lee (then a young Professor at Stanford and currently the Thoma Professor of Operations, Information, and Technology at Stanford Graduate School of Business) and M. Eric Johnson (then an HP employee 1988-1991 and now Professor and Director of the Glassmeyer/McNamee Center for Digital Strategies at the Tuck School of Business at Dartmouth).

The name SPaM came from HP internal location code (LOCXXXX STRAT PLAN MODEL) initially assigned to the group during the days of limited identification fields.  SPM and SM were two initial possibilities but the group settled with the more pronounceable SPaM.  This was the day before internet era where spam was not yet synonymous with unsolicited or undesired bulk electronic message.

Directors

 Corey Billington (1989–1996)
 Rob Hall (1996–2000)
 Gianpaolo Callioni (2000–2003)
 Scott Ellis (2003–2007)
 Thomas Olavson (2007 - 2011)
 Brian Cargille (2011 - 2013)
 Ray Ernenwein (2013 - 2015)
 Barrett Crane (2015 - Present)

Logo

The triangles in SPaM logo represent inventory – the largest asset on the balance sheets of most consumer electronics manufacturers and certainly the largest asset of HP.  The blue bell shape represents uncertainty (including bell-shaped normal distribution) which exists in most decision making situations.  The combination of the shapes is meant to represent SPaM's intention of using analytics to enable decision making under uncertainty to improve asset management performance.

Inside HP

Locations

SPaM supports HP businesses from multiple strategic locations, embedded with HP's various businesses. SPaM's home office is in Palo Alto, HP Inc.'s headquarters;

Services

SPaM employs consulting engagement model where HP businesses pay SPaM for each engagement (project).  Key practice areas include:

 Supply Chain Strategy and Design
 Operations Tools and Processes
 Pricing Analytics

Members

SPaM members are Analytical Business Consultants (ABC) who share strong interests in addressing business decisions from analytical and data-driven perspective.
Typical members possess domain expertise as well as consulting and project management experiences from management consulting firms, or companies in their own industries.  Most have earned MBA, Master’s, and/or Doctoral degrees in technical fields such as economics, engineering, management science, operations research, science, and statistics.  Some individuals who are members of SPaM are also recognized both in the academic community and/or across various industries.

Outside HP

Awards

In 2000, Wal-Mart named HP as its Supplier of the Year.  HP's innovative supply-chain-management models developed by SPaM helped reduce the retailer's inventory-related stock outs.

In 2002, INFORMS gave HP an award for effective integration of Operations Research/Management Science (OR/MS) into organizational decision making, attributed to partnership between SPaM and HP business divisions.

In 2004, HP received Purchasing Magazine’s Company Medal of Professional Excellence. Product design for supply chain and procurement risk management -- two innovations developed by SPaM -- were mentioned as contributions that led to the receipt of this award.
 	
In 2005, design for supply chain and procurement risk management -- innovations developed by SPaM -- were honored by the Council of Supply Chain Management Professionals (CSCMP) as two of the Top 10 Supply Chain Innovations of the Year.

In 2009, HP won the INFORMS Franz Edelman Award, which recognizes outstanding examples of operations research-based projects that transform companies, entire industries, and people’s lives, for its successful product variety management initiatives.  The innovations being honored were a result of a collaborative effort between HP Labs and SPaM, which have saved HP more than $500 million between 2005 and 2008.

Publications
SPaM members have published more than 50 articles on the applications of operations research and management science to solve HP business decisions.  Many have appeared in widely referenced business journals such as Harvard Business Review and Sloan Management Review.  Members have served as an editors to supply chain textbooks used in graduate school programs, and HP supply chain innovations developed by SPaM are cited in many supply chain textbooks.  Brian Cargille, previously the SPaM Director and now the Vice President of Inkjet and Print Solutions at HP, has served on the Editorial Advisory Board of Supply Chain Management Review, an industry magazine, since 2006.  Many MBA programs teach techniques created by SPaM members as part of their curricula.

See also

Strategic planning
Management

References

External links
  a Harvard Business Review article in .pdf form, Building an Innovation Factory, about knowledge-brokering in several organisations, such as IDEO, which mentions HP SPaM on pages 163 and 164.
  a book The Knowing-Doing Gap by Harvard Business School Press which mentions many businesses including HP SPaM (as in Hewlett-Packard's Strategic Planning, Analysis, and Modeling group) for knowledge-brokering management within Hewlett Packard.

Hewlett-Packard